Matteo Rover (born 20 February 1999), is an Italian professional footballer who plays as a forward for  club Südtirol.

Club career

Internazionale
He appeared for the main squad of Inter in a preseason friendly in the summer of 2017.

Loan to Vicenza Virtus and Pordenone
On 21 August 2018, Rover joined to Serie C club Vicenza Virtus on loan for the 2018–19 season. On 7 October he made his professional debut for Vicenza Virtus in Serie C as a substitute replacing Stefano Giacomelli in the 77th minute of a 2–1 home win over Vis Pesaro. His loan was terminated during the 2018–19 season winter break leaving Vicenza Virtus with only one appearance.

On 11 January 2019, Rover was loaned to Serie C club Pordenone until the end of the season. Eight days later, on 19 January, he made his debut for Pordenone as a substitute replacing Davide Gavazzi in the 92nd minute of a 1–0 home win over AlbinoLeffe. On 5 May he played his first match as a starter for the club, a 2–2 away draw against FeralpiSalò, he was replaced by Gianvito Misuraca in the 64th minute. Rover ended his 6-month loan with 13 appearances, but only 1 as a starter.

Loan to Südtirol 
On 15 July 2019, Rover was loaned to Serie C club Südtirol on a season-long loan deal. On 4 August he made his debut for the club in a 4–2 home win over Città di Fasano in the first round of Coppa Italia, he played the entire match. On 25 August he made his league debut for Südtirol as a substitute replacing Daniele Casiraghi in the 68th minute of a 2–1 away win over Vis Pesaro. One week later, on 1 September, Rover scored his first professional goal, as a substitute, in the 47th minute of a 3–2 home defeat against Carpi. On 21 September he played his first entire match for the club in Serie C, a 1–0 away win over Arzignano Valchiampo. Four days later, Rover scored his second goal, again as a substitute, in the 64th minute of a 3–0 home win over Fermana. Rover ended his loan with 30 appearances, 6 goals and 2 assists.

Südtirol 
On 14 August 2020 he moved to Südtirol and signed contract until 2023. He made his seasonal debut, on 22 September, as a starter in the first round of Coppa Italia and he also scored his first goal in the 27th minute of a 2–1 home win over Latte Dolce, he played the entire match. Five days later, on 27 September, Rover made his league debut as a substitute replacing Daniele Casiraghi in the 64th minute of a 2–1 away win over Ravenna.

Career statistics

Club

Honours

Club 
Inter Primavera

 Campionato Primavera 1: 2016–17, 2017–18
 Supercoppa Primavera: 2018
 Torneo Di Viareggio: 2018

Pordenone

 Serie C (Group B): 2018–19
 Supercoppa di Serie C: 2019

References

External links

1999 births
Living people
People from Motta di Livenza
Footballers from Veneto
Italian footballers
Association football forwards
Serie B players
Serie C players
Inter Milan players
L.R. Vicenza players
Pordenone Calcio players
F.C. Südtirol players
Italy youth international footballers
Sportspeople from the Province of Treviso